This is a list of shootings in Texas. This list contains notable homicides committed with firearms and alike within the U.S. state of Texas that have a Wikipedia article for the killing, the killer, or a related subject.

See also 
 Crime in Texas
 List of shootings in California
 List of shootings in Colorado
 List of shootings in Florida
 List of shootings in New York (state)

References

shoot

Lists of shootings by location